The Adventures of Sharkboy and Lavagirl in 3-D (also known as The Adventures of Sharkboy and Lavagirl), is a 2005 American 3D superhero adventure film co-written and directed by Robert Rodriguez and originally released in the United States on June 10, 2005. The production companies were Dimension Films, Columbia Pictures and Troublemaker Studios. The film uses the anaglyph 3D technology, similar to the one used in Spy Kids 3-D: Game Over (2003). The film stars Taylor Lautner, Taylor Dooley, Cayden Boyd, David Arquette, Kristin Davis and George Lopez. Many of the concepts and much of the story were conceived by Rodriguez's children. The film received negative reviews from critics, with much of the criticism directed at the film's story and poor 3-D, while the visual aspects and performances received some praise. The film also underperformed at the box office earning just $39.2 million in the United States and $32.8 million in other territories, for a worldwide total of $72 million worldwide on a $50 million budget.

The special effects were done by Hybride Technologies, Cafe FX, The Orphanage, Post Logic, Hy*drau*lx, Industrial Light & Magic, R!ot Pictures, Tippett Studio, Amalgamated Pixels, Intelligent Creatures and Troublemaker Digital.

Another film featuring Sharkboy and Lavagirl titled We Can Be Heroes was released on Netflix on December 25, 2020 with Dooley reprising her role.

Plot
Max is a ten-year-old boy living in the suburbs of Austin. In his imagination, he has created Planet Drool, where his dreams come to life. It contains two main characters: Sharkboy, whom sharks raised after losing his father (a marine biologist) at sea and became a shark-hybrid himself, and Lavagirl, who can produce fire and lava but has trouble controlling her power so that objects often catch fire when she touches them. Max's parents have little time for him in the real world due to their troubled marriage. At school, he is bullied by his classmate Linus. He does receive friendship from Marissa, the daughter of Max's teacher, Mr. Electricidad. Linus steals Max's dream journal and threatens to "make changes". The next day, twin tornadoes form outside the school. Sharkboy and Lavagirl emerge from the storm and ask Max to accompany them to Planet Drool, which he learns is turning bad thanks to Mr. Electric, a robot resembling Mr. Electricidad and the dreamworld's now-corrupt electrician, under the orders of an unknown mastermind. They travel to Planet Drool with the Shark Rocket and crash land. 

They confront Mr. Electric in his lair, but he drops them into the Dream Graveyard, where many of Max's dreams have been dumped. They find Tobor, a robot toy Max never finished building after being discouraged by his father. Tobor carries them to other parts of the planet. The three of them bond during their journey but face hardships, such as Sharkboy's anger that the oceans are frozen over and Lavagirl's desperation to find her true purpose. While being pursued by Mr. Electric and his evil plug-hounds, they plan to reach the Ice Princess and obtain the Crystal Heart, with which they could freeze time, granting them enough time to reach the center of Planet Drool and for Max to repair the dreamworld by re-dreaming it. Instead, they are captured by Mr. Electric and delivered to the mastermind, who is revealed to be Minus, a villain resembling Linus who has altered Max's journal and hence the dreamworld. After being trapped in a cage, Sharkboy becomes enraged by singing bubbles and destroys the cell in a "shark frenzy". Max retrieves his dream journal while Minus is sleeping. Reading the book, Max informs Sharkboy that his father is still alive, but when Lavagirl wishes to learn what it says about her true identity, she grabs the book, and it burns to ash. In a desperate rage, Lavagirl asks Max why he made her out of lava and runs off. Max wants to follow, but Sharkboy tells him to let her cool down.

The three eventually reach the Ice Princess, who resembles Marissa. She hands over the Crystal Heart, but they cannot stop the corruption since the Ice Princess is the only one who can use the Crystal Heart's power and cannot leave her home. Afterward, Mr. Electric knocks Sharkboy unconscious by tricking him into jumping into a lake filled with electric eels, which are his weakness. Lavagirl sacrifices herself by jumping into the water to retrieve him. Max realizes he has been selfish in wanting to return to Earth. Tobor appears and convinces Max to dream a better, unselfish dream. Just then, Sharkboy regains consciousness and races Lavagirl to a volcano to revive her. Max realizes that Lavagirl's purpose is as a light against the darkness, engulfing Planet Drool. Max becomes the Daydreamer and gains reality-warping powers to defeat Minus. He then offers that the two join to make a better dreamworld, and Minus agrees. Lavagirl thanks Max and Sharkboy for saving her.

Minus offers to let Mr. Electric return to running Planet Drool, but Mr. Electric reveals that he never enjoyed doing so in the first place. He tells Max that he made a terrible mistake of dreaming him up and flies to Earth to kill Max while he is dreaming. Max awakens back in his classroom during the tornado storm. Mr. Electric arrives in the tornado in front of the class and an astonished Mr. Electricidad. Max's parents are caught in the tornado but are saved by Sharkboy and Lavagirl. Max gives the Crystal Heart to Marissa so she can use the Ice Princess's powers to freeze and destroy Mr. Electric. Mr. Electricidad, Linus, and Max make peace with one another, and Max reunites with his now-reconciled parents.

Later, Max informs his class that Planet Drool is a proper dreamworld again, that Sharkboy is now King of the Ocean and that Lavagirl is Queen of Earth's Volcanoes. As Max finally repairs Tobor, he reminds the class (and the audience) to "dream a better dream and work to make it real".

Cast
 Cayden Boyd as Max. An imaginative 10-year-old boy, known as the "day-dreamer" on Planet Drool. "At first he's dreaming all for himself; he wants Shark Boy and Lava Girl to take him away", Boyd said about the role. "I like that he's selfish in the beginning and he's not selfish in the end".
 Taylor Lautner as Sharkboy. Lautner said about the character, "He's very self-confident and sometimes his confidence gets him into trouble. He's also kinda jealous of the character, Max, because he has an inside crush on Lavagirl and she's overly motherly to Max." Lautner's martial arts skills helped him to obtain the role of Sharkboy. "When I auditioned for the film, Robert Rodriguez, the director, didn't know that I had my martial arts [background], and while we were there in Austin, TX he saw a DVD of me and asked me to choreograph my own fight scenes", said Lautner. Lautner was the first to audition for the film, says Rodriguez, and was chosen immediately.
 Taylor Dooley as Lavagirl. The role was cast after the two other main characters, Sharkboy and Max had already been cast. Her lava bike was computer-generated, like many of the elements in the film; Dooley and Lautner described the on-set versions of the lava bike and Sharkboy's shark-themed jetski as "a green box with handles".
 David Arquette and Kristin Davis play Max's parents. Max's father is an unemployed writer. They are on the brink of a divorce. They mean well for Max, but are unable to solve his problems. On Planet Drool, Max's parents appear as a pair of "Cookie Giants" who live happily in the Land of Milk and Cookies.
 George Lopez as Mr. Electricidad, Mr. Electric, the voice of Tobor, and the voice of the Ice Guardian. Mr. Electricidad is Max's teacher. Mr. Electric is Planet Drool's corrupt electrician. Tobor is an unfinished robot of Max that resided in the Dream Graveyard. The Ice Guardian is an inhabitant of the Ice Kingdom. Rodriguez states that he kept asking Lopez to play additional characters. Lopez spent a total of two weeks working on the film.
 Jacob Davich as Linus / Minus. He is a bully at Max's school and steals his Dream Journal. With it, he enters Max's dreamworld and, using the name "Minus" (a nickname bestowed by Mr. Electricidad for Linus' habit of disliked conduct), alters it to his version before ultimately befriending Max.
 Sasha Pieterse as Marissa Electricidad / Ice Princess. Marissa is the daughter of Mr. Electricidad, and at first, the only student who befriends Max. On Planet Drool, she appears as the Ice Princess, the ruler of the Ice Kingdom and keeper of the Crystal Heart, a necklace she wears that can freeze anything including time.

Director Robert Rodriguez has an uncredited role voicing a shark, and his children, Rebel and Racer, portray Sharkboy at age five and age seven respectively. Rico Torres portrays Sharkboy's father. Marc Musso and Shane Graham play children at Max's school.

Production
Parts of the film were shot on location in Texas from September to December 2004, where Max resides and goes to school in the film. Much of the film was shot in a studio against green screen. Most of the ships, landscapes and other effects including some creatures and characters, were accomplished digitally. According to Lautner and Dooley, when filming the scene with the dream train, the front part of the train was an actual physical set piece. "The whole inside was there and when they have all the gadgets you can pull on, that was all there but everything else was a green screen," said Dooley.
Eleven visual effects companies (Hybride Technologies, Cafe FX, The Orphanage, Post Logic, Hy*drau*lx, Industrial Light & Magic, R!ot Pictures, Tippett Studio, Amalgamated Pixels and Intelligent Creatures and Rodriguez's Texas-based Troublemaker Digital) worked on the film in order to accomplish over 1,000 visual effect shots.

Robert Rodriguez appears in the credits fourteen times, most notably as director, a producer, a screenwriter (along with Marcel Rodriguez), visual effects supervisor, director of photography, editor, a camera operator, and a composer and performer. The story is credited to Racer Max Rodriguez, with additional story elements by Rebecca Rodriguez, who also wrote the lyrics for the main song, "Sharkboy and Lavagirl". Other members of the Rodriguez family can be seen in the film or were involved in the production.

Miley Cyrus had auditioned for the film with Lautner, and said it came down to her and another girl who was also auditioning; however, Cyrus then began production on Hannah Montana, and thus the other girl, presumably Dooley, got the role.

Reception

Box office
For its opening weekend, The Adventures of Sharkboy and Lavagirl in 3-D earned $12.6 million in 2,655 theaters. It was placed at number 5 at the box office, being overshadowed by Mr. & Mrs. Smith, Madagascar, Star Wars: Episode III – Revenge of the Sith, and The Longest Yard. Grossing $39.2 million in the United States and $32.8 million in other territories for a worldwide total of $72 million, the film was a box office flop.

Critical response 
The critical consensus reads, "The decision to turn this kiddie fantasy into a 3-D film was a miscalculation." On Metacritic, it has a weighted average score of 38 out of 100 based on reviews from 31 critics, indicating "generally unfavorable reviews". Audiences polled by CinemaScore gave the film a grade "B+" on scale of A to F.

Roger Ebert gave the film two out of four stars and agreed with the other criticisms in which the 3-D process used was distracting and muted the colors, thus, he believes, "spoiling" much of the film and that the film would look more visually appealing when released in the home media market.

However, in the years that followed, the film developed a cult following due to its "so-bad-it's-good" nature.

Soundtrack

Director Robert Rodriguez composed parts of the score himself, with contributions by composers John Debney and Graeme Revell.

Books
Around the time of the film's debut Rodriguez co-wrote a series of children's novels entitled Sharkboy and Lavagirl Adventures with acclaimed science fiction writer Chris Roberson. They include Book 1, The Day Dreamer, and Book 2, Return to Planet Drool, which announces that it will be continued in a third volume, Deep Sleep, which was never released. There was also a release of "Max's Journal" which shows more of the character's dream journal from the movie, as well as "The Illustrated Screenplay", which shows the script with concept designs, preproduction art, character sketches, and behind the scenes photos. They are illustrated throughout by Alex Toader, who designed characters and environments for the film and the previous  Spy kids franchise.

Jeff Jensen of Entertainment Weekly praised another book appearing around the time of the film, The Adventures of SharkBoy and LavaGirl: The Movie Storybook (by Racer Max Rodriguez and Robert Rodriguez), as a far cry from the usual movie storybook tie-in, and also praised Alex Toader's "cartoony yet detailed" illustrations.

Lawsuit
The Total Nonstop Action professional wrestler Dean Roll, who trademarked the name "Shark Boy" in 1999, sued Miramax on June 8, 2005, claiming that his trademark had been infringed and demanding "[any] money, profits and advantages wrongfully gained". In April 2007, the suit was settled for a disclosed amount of $200,000.

Followup

In an interview during the 2020 Comic-Con@Home event, Rodriguez confirmed that a character in his then-upcoming film We Can Be Heroes was the youngest daughter of Sharkboy and Lavagirl who has shark powers. Taylor Dooley was confirmed to reprise her role in the film as Lavagirl, although Lautner did not reprise his role. We Can Be Heroes was released through Netflix in December 2020. In January 2021, a sequel was announced.

References

External links

 
 
 

2005 films
2005 romantic comedy films
2005 3D films
2000s adventure comedy films
2000s fantasy comedy films
2000s teen comedy films
2000s superhero films
American 3D films
American children's adventure films
American romantic fantasy films
American comedy horror films
American children's comedy films
American romantic comedy films
American children's fantasy films
American superhero films
Child superheroes
Columbia Pictures films
Miramax films
Dimension Films films
2000s English-language films
American films with live action and animation
Films scored by John Debney
Films scored by Graeme Revell
Films scored by Robert Rodriguez
Film superheroes
Films about dreams
Films about nightmares
Films about orphans
Films directed by Robert Rodriguez
Films produced by Elizabeth Avellán
Films set in Austin, Texas
Films shot in Austin, Texas
Films with screenplays by Robert Rodriguez
Teen superhero comedy films
Troublemaker Studios films
2005 comedy films
Films about educators
2000s American films